Jefferson High School is the public high school in Conception Junction, Missouri.

See also
Education in Missouri
List of colleges and universities in Missouri
List of high schools in Missouri
Missouri Department of Elementary and Secondary Education

References

External links
School website

Public high schools in Missouri
Schools in Nodaway County, Missouri